The 14 regions of Senegal are subdivided into 46 departments and 103 arrondissements (neither of which have administrative function) and by collectivités locales (the 14 régions, 110 communes, and 320 communautés rurales) which elect administrative officers.

Since three new regions increased the number of departments to 45 in 2008, the most recent addition, of Keur Massar, in May 2008 brings the number to 46. 

The departments are listed below, by region:

Dakar Region

Dakar Department
Guédiawaye Department
Keur Massar Department (since May 2021)
Pikine Department
Rufisque Department

Diourbel Region

Bambey Department
Diourbel Department
Mbacké Department

Fatick Region

Fatick Department
Foundiougne Department
Gossas Department

Kaffrine Region

Kaffrine Department
Birkilane Department
Koungheul Department
Malem Hoddar Department

Kaolack Region

Guinguinéo Department
Kaolack Department
Nioro du Rip Department

Kédougou Region

Kédougou Department
Salémata Department
Saraya Department

Kolda Region

Kolda Department
Médina Yoro Foulah Department
Vélingara Department

Louga Region

Kébémer Department
Linguère Department
Louga Department

Matam Region

Kanel Department
Matam Department
Ranérou Ferlo Department

Saint-Louis Region

Dagana Department
Podor Department
Saint-Louis Department

Sédhiou Region

Bounkiling Department
Goudomp Department
Sédhiou Department

Tambacounda Region

Bakel Department
Goudiry Department
Koumpentoum Department
Tambacounda Department

Thiès Region

M'bour Department
Thiès Department
Tivaouane Department

Ziguinchor Region

Bignona Department
Oussouye Department
Ziguinchor Department

See also
Regions of Senegal
Arrondissements of Senegal

References 

 List of administrative divisions in Senegal 
 Collectivités locales  from Republic of Senegal Government site, l'Agence de l'informatique de l'État (ADIE).
 Map of main subdivisions and more detailed maps on subdivisions
 Décret fixant le ressort territorial et le chef lieu des régions et des départements , décret n°2002-166, 21 February 2002
 Code des collectivités locales , Loi n° 96-06, 22 March 1996
 United States Department of State
 https://web.archive.org/web/20060327012804/http://www.geohive.com/cd/link.php?xml=sn&xsl=neo1

 
Subdivisions of Senegal
Senegal, Departments
Senegal 2
Departments, Senegal
Senegal geography-related lists